The men's 10,000 metres at the 1966 European Athletics Championships was held in Budapest, Hungary, at Népstadion on 30 August 1966.

Medalists

Results

Final
30 August

Participation
According to an unofficial count, 22 athletes from 13 countries participated in the event.

 (1)
 (1)
 (2)
 (1)
 (3)
 (1)
 (2)
 (2)
 (1)
 (1)
 (3)
 (3)
 (1)

References

10000 metres
10,000 metres at the European Athletics Championships
Marathons in Hungary